The men's tournament of water polo at the 2012 Summer Olympics at London, Great Britain, began on 29 July and lasted until 12 August 2012. All games were held at the Water Polo Arena.

Teams from twelve nations competed in the tournament and were seeded into two groups for the preliminary round. A total of 42 games were played, 30 of them in the preliminary round.

Format
The format of water polo at the 2012 Summer Olympics:
Twelve teams were divided into two preliminary groups, composed of six teams each, and played a single round robin in each group.
The top 4 teams from each group played against each other in a cross-group format in the Quarterfinals.
Winners from the Quarterfinal progressed to the Semifinals and played against another winner from the Quarterfinal round. Losers went on to play classification games.
Winners of the Semifinals contested the gold medal game and the losers the bronze medal game.

Preliminary round

Group A

All times are British Summer Time (UTC+1).

Group B

Medal round
Bracket

Quarter-finals

Semi-finals

Bronze medal match

Gold medal match

Classification
Bracket

5th–8th place semi-finals

7th–8th place match

5th–6th place match

Final ranking

Medalists

Statistics

Multi-time Olympians

Five-time Olympian(s): 3 players
 : Igor Hinić
 : Georgios Afroudakis
 : Tamás Kásás

Four-time Olympian(s): 14 players
 : Thomas Whalan, Gavin Woods
 : Samir Barać, Frano Vićan (GK)
 : Theodoros Chatzitheodorou, Nikolaos Deligiannis (GK)
 : Péter Biros, Gergely Kiss, Zoltán Szécsi (GK)
 : Stefano Tempesti (GK)
 : Nikolay Maksimov (GK)
 : Iván Pérez
 : Tony Azevedo, Ryan Bailey

Multiple medalists

Three-time Olympic medalist(s): 5 players
 : Péter Biros, Tamás Kásás, Gergely Kiss, Zoltán Szécsi (GK)
 : Vanja Udovičić

Leading goalscorers

Source: Official Results Book (page 466)

Leading goalkeepers

Source: Official Results Book (page 462)

Leading sprinters

Source: Official Results Book (page 465)

Awards
The men's all-star team was announced on 12 August 2012.

Most Valuable Player
  Josip Pavić (85 saves)

Media All-Star Team
 Goalkeeper
  Josip Pavić (85 saves)
 Field players
  Nikša Dobud (centre forward, 12 goals)
  Maurizio Felugo (12 goals)
  Filip Filipović (left-handed, 18 goals, 2 sprints won)
  Aleksandar Ivović (centre back, 19 goals)
  Felipe Perrone (16 goals)
  Andrija Prlainović (22 goals)

See also
 Water polo at the 2012 Summer Olympics – Women's tournament

References

Sources
 PDF documents on the FINA website:
 Official Results Book – 2012 Olympic Games – Diving, Swimming, Synchronised Swimming, Water Polo (archive) (pp. 284–507)
 Water polo on the Olympedia website
 Water polo at the 2012 Summer Olympics (men's tournament)
 Water polo on the Sports Reference website
 Water polo at the 2012 Summer Games (men's tournament) (archived)

O
Men's tournament
Men's events at the 2012 Summer Olympics